Andrias matthewi, or Matthew's giant salamander, is an extinct species of giant salamander from the Miocene of North America. It belongs to the genus Andrias, which contains the living Asian giant salamanders. Its fossils have been found in Nebraska, Colorado, and Saskatchewan.

Taxonomy

In 1917, Harold Cook named the new genus and species Plicagnathus matthewi for a dentary from the "lower Snake Creek beds" of Nebraska. The species was named in honor of William Diller Matthew, who first identified the specimen. In 1963, Joseph Tihen and Charles Chantell named the new species Cryptobranchus mccalli for two maxillae from the Valentine Formation of Nebraska. Charles Meszoely synonymized C. mccalli with P. matthewi and Plicagnathus with Andrias in 1966, leading to the current name Andrias matthewi. Bruce Naylor synonymized Andrias with Cryptobranchus in 1981, resulting in the combination Cryptobranchus matthewi, but this was not accepted by subsequent authors.

Size
Cook estimated a length of  based on the holotype dentary. Naylor estimated a length of  using two vertebrae from the Wood Mountain Formation of Saskatchewan.

Notes

References

Cryptobranchidae
Amphibians described in 1917